Deep Cover is a 1992 American action thriller film.

Deep Cover may also refer to:
 Deep Cover (soundtrack), the film's soundtrack album
 "Deep Cover" (song), the film's theme song, performed by Dr. Dre and Snoop Dogg
 Blade on the Feather, a 1980 British TV film, released in the U.S. on VHS as Deep Cover